Žemlička (feminine: Žemličková) is a Czech surname. Notable people with the surname include:

 Milan Žemlička (born 1996), Czech biathlete
 Richard Žemlička (born 1964), Czech ice hockey player

Czech-language surnames